Syed Ahmed Aga (1910-1984) was an Indian politician and the member of parliament, who was elected during the fourth and fifth Lok Sabhas of India. He was representing Baramulla parliamentary constituency from 1967 to 1970, and then re-elected in May 1970. He was affiliated with Indian National Congress political party.

Life and background 
Aga was born in 1910 in Srinagar to Khan Bahadur Aga Syed Hussain Thakur, Home and Judicial Minister during Maharaja Hari Singh's reign. His sister Begum Zafar Ali an activist and educationist was the first female matriculate of Kashmir. Aga served in the Jammu and Kashmir Administrative Service until 1965, and later, he served as the member of Jammu and Kashmir Public Service Commission from 1965 to 1967. Prior to contesting general elections, he administered various offices in Jammu and Kashmir state, and served as the director for Food Department''' and a member-secretary for Food Procurement and Distribution Committee''. He was the director at rural development and secretary to the Government of Jammu and Kashmir for departments of health, education-works (PHE), Co-operatives and Home.  Aga was one of the members in Permanent Mission of India to the United Nations to 25th session in 1970. He died in 1984.

References 

Indian National Congress politicians from Jammu and Kashmir
Kashmiri people
India MPs 1967–1970
Year of death missing
India MPs 1971–1977
1910 births
Date of birth missing
Place of death missing
Politicians from Srinagar